Polystira macra is a species of sea snail, a marine gastropod mollusk in the family Turridae, the turrids.

Description

Distribution
This marine species off Puerto Rico at a depth between 476 m and 658 m.

References

 Bartsch, Paul, and Fund Johnson. New mollusks of the family Turritidae. na, 1934.

External links
  Todd J.A. & Rawlings T.A. (2014). A review of the Polystira clade — the Neotropic’s largest marine gastropod radiation (Neogastropoda: Conoidea: Turridae sensu stricto). Zootaxa. 3884(5): 445-491

macra
Gastropods described in 1934